Colette Francoise Hué (11 May 1932 – 31 March 2007) was a French gymnast. She competed at the 1948 Summer Olympics and the 1952 Summer Olympics.

References

1932 births
2007 deaths
French female artistic gymnasts
Olympic gymnasts of France
Gymnasts at the 1948 Summer Olympics
Gymnasts at the 1952 Summer Olympics
20th-century French women